A Pestering Journey is a documentary film directed by K.R. Manoj. It was released in 2010.

Plot 
A voyage through two similar pesticide tragedies in post independent India, Pestering Journey interrogates the legitimate forms and technologies of killing available in a culture. In an atypical move it challenges and changes the idioms of pesticide and genocide. It is a journey which takes a pestering turn and blurs the boundaries of nature and culture, of self and other, of life, death and many other comfortable binaries.

Awards and nominations
Won National Film Awards 2010
 Best Investigative Film
 National Film Award for Best Non-Feature Film Audiography - Harikumar Madhavan Nair

References

External links
 

Indian documentary films
2010 films
2010 documentary films
Documentary films about environmental issues